Guillermo 'Guille' Donoso Alonso (born 8 July 1995) is a Spanish footballer who plays for Xerez Deportivo FC as a right winger.

Club career
Donoso was born in Gijón, Asturias. A Sporting de Gijón youth graduate, he made his senior debut with the reserves on 3 February 2013, coming on as a first-half substitute in a 0–4 Segunda División B away loss against UD Salamanca.

On 14 August 2013, Donoso signed a professional three-year deal with the Rojiblancos, and scored his first senior goal on 1 September, netting the first in a 4–1 home routing of CD Tropezón. On 10 September he was called up to the main squad for a Copa del Rey match against Recreativo de Huelva, but remained unused in the 2–3 loss in the extra-time.

On 1 July 2016, after spending the rest of his spell exclusively with the B-team, Donoso signed a three-year contract with Segunda División side Córdoba CF. He made his professional debut on 20 August, coming on as a second-half substitute for goalscorer Alejandro Alfaro in a 1–0 home win against CD Tenerife.

Donoso scored his first professional goal on 17 September 2016, netting the game's only in a home success over Levante UD. The following 22 June he cut ties with the club, and signed a contract with fellow league team CD Lugo eight days later.

On 31 January 2018, Donoso joined SD Ponferradina on loan until the end of the season. He returned to Lugo in July, but after failing to make any league appearances, he rejoined Ponfe on 22 January 2019, also in a temporary deal.

On 2 July 2019, despite suffering a knee injury which shortened his contribution to the side's promotion to the second division, Donoso signed a permanent contract with the Castilian-Leonese club. After only four games for the club, his contract was terminated by mutual consent on 31 January 2020.

On 24 July 2020, Donoso signed with Real Unión.

References

External links

1995 births
Living people
Footballers from Gijón
Spanish footballers
Association football wingers
Segunda División players
Segunda División B players
Sporting de Gijón B players
Córdoba CF players
CD Lugo players
SD Ponferradina players
Real Unión footballers
Spain youth international footballers